The Carlos Fermín Fitzcarrald Province is one of 20 provinces of the Ancash Region of Peru. It is named after Carlos Fermín Fitzcarrald, the rubber tycoon whose life served as an inspiration behind the 1982 film Fitzcarraldo.

Geography 
Other mountains are listed below:

The Yana Mayu ("black river") flows along the northern border of the province.

Political division
Carlos Fermín Fitzcarrald is divided into 3 districts, which are:

Ethnic groups 
The people in the province are mainly indigenous citizens of Quechua descent. Quechua is the language which the majority of the population (90.87%) learnt to speak in childhood, 8.65% of the residents started speaking using the Spanish language (2007 Peru Census).

See also 
 Maray Qalla
 Wachuqucha

Sources 

Provinces of the Ancash Region